Rierguscha florida is a species of beetle in the family Cerambycidae. It was described by Napp and Martins in 2006.

References

Unxiini
Beetles described in 2006